Pemmy Castelina Pamela Majodina (born 24 December 1968) is a South African politician serving as a Member of the National Assembly since 2019. A member of the African National Congress, she is the party's chief whip in the assembly. She was formerly a Member of the Eastern Cape Provincial Legislature between 2004 and 2019 and a Member of the provincial Executive Council for five different portfolios from 2008 to 2019, respectively. Majodina was a permanent delegate to the National Council of Provinces from 1994 to 2004.

Early life and education
Majodina was born on 24 December 1968 in Sterkspruit, Cape Province. She studied to become an educator.

Political career
Majodina served on the regional executives, the provincial executives and the national executives of the South African Student Congress, the African National Congress Youth League, the African National Congress Women's League, the South African Communist Party and the African National Congress. She was also an underground operative of uMkhonto we Sizwe.

Following the April 1994 elections, Majodina was sworn in as a member of the Senate (which became the National Council of Provinces in 1997). She served two terms in the NCOP until her election to the Eastern Cape Provincial Legislature in the June 2004 provincial election. She was appointed the Chairperson of Roads and Public Works Portfolio Committee after her swearing-in. Newly elected Premier Mbulelo Sogoni appointed her as the Member of the Executive Council (MEC) for Health in August 2008.

After the April 2009 provincial election, Noxolo Kiviet became Premier. She made her the MEC for Roads and Public Works. In November 2010, Kiviet moved Majodina to the Social Development and Special Programmes portfolio. Phumulo Masualle was elected Premier after the May 2014 election. He appointed her MEC for Sport, Recreation, Arts and Culture. In May 2018, Masualle appointed her MEC for Public Works.

After the May 2019 elections, Majodina was selected to return to Parliament as a Member of the National Assembly. The National Executive Committee of the African National Congress named her the party's chief whip in the National Assembly, and she assumed the position upon her inauguration. She is the second woman to hold the post and Doris Dlakude deputises her.

Awards and accolades
Majodina was awarded an Honorary Doctorate in community development from the Arlington University of Australia in 2010. The next year, the Methodist Church of Southern Africa gave her their Reverend Baartman Award. In 2015, Reverend Jesse Jackson awarded her with a Global Humanitarian Award.

Incidents
In April 2015, Public Protector Thuli Madonsela recommended that Masualle take disciplinary steps against Majodina after an investigation found that funds were misappropriated towards her during a visit to the United States in September 2012. She later paid back the funds.

Personal life
Majodina has nine children, of which seven are adopted and two are biological. She is estranged from her husband. Majodina is a Christian.

References

External links

*

Living people
1968 births
People from Senqu Local Municipality
People from Joe Gqabi District Municipality
Xhosa people
African National Congress politicians
20th-century South African politicians
21st-century South African politicians
20th-century South African women politicians
21st-century South African women politicians
Members of the Eastern Cape Provincial Legislature
Members of the National Assembly of South Africa
Members of the National Council of Provinces
Women members of the National Council of Provinces
Women members of provincial legislatures of South Africa